Diego Germini (born 30 July 1995), known professionally as Izi, is an Italian rapper and actor.

His studio albums Pizzicato (2017) and Aletheia (2019) peaked number 1 of FIMI's albums chart.

Discography

Studio albums 
 Fenice (2016)
 Pizzicato (2017)
 Aletheia (2019)
 Riot (2020)

Mixtapes 
 Macchie di Rorshach, with Sangue (2013)
 Kidnapped Mixtape (2014)
 Julian Ross Mixtape (2015)

Filmography

References

Italian rappers
Living people
21st-century Italian  male singers
1995 births